This is a list of FM radio stations in the United States having call signs beginning with the letters KW through KZ. Low-power FM radio stations, those with designations such as KWAH-LP, have not been included in this list.

KW--

KX--

KY--

KZ--

See also
 North American call sign

FM radio stations in the United States by call sign (initial letters KW-KZ)